Orovnik is a village in the municipality of Debarca, North Macedonia. It used to be part of the former municipality of Mešeišta. It is located close to Ohrid Airport.

Demographics
As of the 2021 census, Orovnik had 472 residents with the following ethnic composition:
Macedonians 453
Persons for whom data are taken from administrative sources 18
Others 1

According to the 2002 census, the village had a total of 440 inhabitants. Ethnic groups in the village include:

Macedonians 439
Serbs 1

References

Villages in Debarca Municipality